The non-marine molluscs of Jamaica are a part of the molluscan fauna of Jamaica. A number of species of non-marine molluscs are found in the wild in the Caribbean island of Jamaica.

Land gastropods have a large degree of endemism in 90% of the species. 505 species of land gastropods are endemic to Jamaica.

Land gastropods 

Pleurodontidae
 Pleurodonte amabilis
 Pleurodonte catadupae
 Pleurodonte candescens

See also
 List of marine molluscs of Jamaica

Lists of molluscs of surrounding countries:
 List of non-marine molluscs of Cuba
 List of non-marine molluscs of Haiti
 List of non-marine molluscs of the Dominican Republic

References

External links 
 Rosenberg G. & Muratov I. V. (11 August 2005). "Recent terrestrial molluscs of Jamaica".

Molluscs
Lists of biota of Jamaica
Jamaica
Jamaica
Jamaica